Hellzapoppin is a musical revue written by the comedy team of Olsen and Johnson, consisting of John "Ole" Olsen and Harold "Chic" Johnson, with music and lyrics by Sammy Fain and Charles Tobias. The revue was a hit, running for over three years, and was at the time the longest-running Broadway musical, with 1,404 performances, making it one of only three plays to run more than 500 performances in the 1930s.

Production
In 1938, after opening at the Shubert Theatre in Boston on September 10, Hellzapoppin opened on Broadway at the original 46th Street Theatre on September 22, transferred to the Winter Garden Theatre on November 26, and finally moved to the Majestic Theatre on November 25, 1941. It closed on December 17, 1941, after a total of 1,404 performances.

Olsen and Johnson led a large cast of entertainers: the comedy team of Barto and Mann (Dewey Barto and George Mann); Charles Whithers; celebrity impersonators, the Radio Rogues; Hal Sherman; Walter Nilsson; singing group The Charioteers; identical-twin dancers Betty Mae and Beverly Crane; stage magician Theo Hardeen (better known as Harry Houdini's younger brother); the Hawaiian music of Ray Kinney and the Aloha Maids; Bergh and Moore; J. C. Olsen; Reed, Dean and Reed (Bonnie Reed, Syd Dean, and Mel Reed); Roberta and Ray; The Starlings; Dorothy Thomas; Shirley Wayne; Cyrel Roodney and June Winters; Billy Adams; and Whitey's Steppers (also known as Whitey's Lindy Hoppers). Olsen and Johnson were succeeded by Jay C. Flippen and Happy Felton in June 1940.

On the road
In late 1940 and during 1941, while Hellzapoppin was still playing at the Winter Garden Theatre and later the Majestic Theatre, a second edition of Hellzapoppin with Billy House and Eddie Garr toured the country. The cast included Grace & Nokko, The Oxford Boys, Sterner Sisters, Ben Dova, Paul Gordon, Billy Potter and Bobby Jarvis.

Following the close of Hellzapoppin at the Majestic Theatre on December 18, 1941, many in the Broadway cast went on the road during 1942 with Jay C. Flippen and Happy Felton. This road edition of Hellzapoppin included Barto and Mann, Charles Withers, the Radio Rogues, Harry Reso, Walter Nilsson, The Charioteers, Lyda Sue, Theo Hardeen, June Winters, Bonnie Reed, Shirley Wayne, Ruth Faber, Stephanie Olsen, Bergh and Moore, Dippy Diers, Bobby Barry, Billy Adams, and Sid Dean. The road shows continued in the same style of sight gags, risqué humor, and audience involvement.

In late 1942, a New 1943 Hellzapoppin revue with Jackie Gleason and Lew Parker was staged at the Nixon Theatre, Pittsburgh, Pennsylvania; the Hanna Theatre, Cleveland, Ohio; and the Erlanger Theatre, Chicago, Illinois. The cast included many of the original and road show performers (Barto and Mann, the Radio Rogues, Charles Withers, Theo Hardeen, Harry Reso, Stephen Olsen, Bergh and Moore, Dippy Diers and Billy Adams) and several newcomers to the show (the Biltmorettes, the Commandos, the Kim Loo Sisters, Mary McNamee, and Jean Baker).

In 1949, Olsen and Johnson went back on the road with Hellzapoppin of 1949. The all new cast featured Harrison & Fisher, Shirley, Sharon & Wanda, Nirska, Jose Duval, Gloria LeRoy, Frank Cook, 6 Mighty Atoms, Shannon Dean, Helen Magna, Andy Ratouscheff, Hank Whitehouse, John Howes, Billy Kay, Maurice Millard, Frank Hardy, J.C. Olsen, June Johnson, and Marty May.

Film

A film based on the stage musical was made by Universal Pictures and released in 1941. Although the Broadway cast was initially slated to appear in the film, except for Olsen and Johnson and the Whitey's Lindy Hoppers, no one else from any of the stage productions appeared in the film.

International productions
A production of Hellzapoppin toured Australia in 1949-50 playing in Melbourne, Adelaide, Perth and Sydney. The Australian shows were produced by J. C. Williamson, and featured a predominantly American cast including Don de Leo and George Mayo (as 'Olsen and Johnson'), Gloria Gilbert, Tom Toby, Marlene Lilyponds, Dorothy Jean, Snowball Whittier, Charlie Pope, trombonist Reg Thorpe, and David Hogarth. Various 'locals' joined the cast in some cities: Bob Dyer in Perth, and Roy Rene in Sydney. A production also played in Sydney in 1954, including female impersonator Maurice Millard.

Broadway revival
In 1976, there was an attempt to revive the show with a cast that included Jerry Lewis and Lynn Redgrave, but it closed on the road before reaching Broadway.

Sketches
A comedy hodgepodge full of sight gags and slapstick, the show was continually rewritten throughout its run to remain topical; it opened with newsreel clips of Adolf Hitler speaking in a Yiddish accent, Benito Mussolini speaking in blackface minstrel dialect, and Franklin D. Roosevelt speaking gibberish, before the real-life Olsen and Johnson burst through the image (actually, a transparent sheet in front of the screen). A circus atmosphere prevailed, with dwarfs, clowns, trained pigeons and audience participation adding to the merriment. Chorus girls left the stage to dance with audience members or sit in their laps. Laundry-filled clotheslines were strung across the theater over the audiences' heads, and some seats were wired with electric buzzers that were triggered during the performance.

The sketches were a "smorgasbord of explode-the-fourth-wall nuttiness:... comedy songs; skits abandoned partway through; cameos by audience stooges; an absurdist raffle; and in a trademark stunt, a man who wandered through the theater hawking an ever-larger potted tree". The comedy continued even after the show had ended, as departing audience members discovered the man who'd been carrying the increasingly tall plant waiting for them the lobby, trapped and shouting atop a 20-foot tree.

Seeing a painting of a warship, Olsen and Johnson began firing weapons at it until it sank inside the frame. At this point, a soaking wet man in a uniform walked onstage, but was shot to death by the pair because "a captain always goes down with his ship!" As an actress walked the aisles yelling, "Oscar!", another loudly said that she was just going to use the bathroom. When this started to overwhelm, an actor started loudly selling tickets to the competing Broadway show I Married an Angel.

Songs
Lyrics and music by Sammy Fain and Charles Tobias (unless otherwise noted).
Act 1
 "Blow a Balloon Up to the Moon"
 "Fuddle-Dee-Duddle"
 "A Bedtime Story"
 "Strolling Thru the Park"
 "Abe Lincoln" (Music and Lyrics By Earl Robinson and Alfred Hayes)
 "Shaganola"
 "It's Time To Say Aloha"
Act 2
 "Harem on the Loose"
 "Ol' Man Mose'" (Music and Lyrics By Louis Armstrong and Zilner T. Randolph)
 "When You Look in Your Looking Glass" (Lyrics By Sam M. Lewis, Music By Paul Mann and Stephen Weiss)
 "When McGregor Sings Off Key"
 "Boomps-a-Daisy (I Like a Bustle that Bends)"
 "We Won't Let It Happen Here"

Songs featured during the run also include work by Don George, Teddy Hall, Annette Mills, Gonzalo Curiel, and Oscar Hammerstein II.

References

External links
 
 Hellzapoppin', illustrated article on the Collecting Books and Magazines website
 Sonny Watson Dance History Pages -- HELLZAPOPPIN, The Play
 Hellzapoppin study guide, synopsis, background, americancentury.org, 2007

1938 musicals
Broadway musicals
Lindy Hop
Revues
1930s in comedy